Berimbau
bodhrán
Bombo legüero
Cajon
Dhol
Dholak
Djembe
Dunun
Gamelan
Kpanlogo
Lagerphone
Latin percussion
Marimbula
Pogo cello
Steelpan
hank drum
Thavil
Urumee
Udukai
Mridangam
Taiko
Timbal
Tonbak
Washboard

Folk